Kamman may refer to:

Doda Kamman, a village in Sultanpur Lodhi in Kapurthala district of Punjab State, India
The Kamman Building, or The John F. Kamman Building, a historic commercial building in Buffalo, New York
Kam Man Food, a Chinese American Chinese supermarket chain, also known as KM Food

People with the surname
Curtis Warren Kamman (born 1939), American career diplomat
Effie F. Kamman (1868–1933), American composer, pianist, music teacher and vaudeville performer
Leigh Kamman (1922–2014), American radio host 
Madeleine Kamman (1931–2018), French chef and restaurateur, cookery teacher and author